Emarginula agulhasensis is a species of sea snail, a marine gastropod mollusk in the family Fissurellidae, the keyhole limpets and slit limpets.

Description
The length of the shell attains 6.25 mm, its diameter 4 mm.

References

External links
 To World Register of Marine Species
  Thiele J., 1925. Gastropoden der Deutschen Tiefsee-Expedition. In:. Wissenschaftliche Ergebnisse der Deutschen Tiefsee-Expedition auf dem Dampfer “Valdivia” 1898-1899  II. Teil, vol. 17, No. 2, Gutstav Fischer, Berlin

Fissurellidae
Gastropods described in 1925